Carlos Manuel Oliveiros da Silva (born 9 March 1959), known as Vermelhinho, is a Portuguese former professional footballer who played as a left winger.

Club career
Born in São João da Madeira, Aveiro District, Vermelhinho signed for FC Porto in 1982 after starting out at local A.D. Sanjoanense. In the 1983–84 European Cup Winners' Cup he scored arguably his most important career goal, as the former team won 1–0 away against Aberdeen in the second leg of the semi-finals (2–0 on aggregate): in a foggy night, he netted through an amazing long-range lob, and went on to also play the entire decisive match, lost 1–2 to Juventus FC.

Vermelhinho closed out his career at the age of 36 with his first club Sanjoanense, also having one-season spells with G.D. Chaves, S.C. Braga and S.C. Espinho.

International career
Vermelhinho earned two caps for Portugal, being picked for the squad at UEFA Euro 1984 where he did not leave the bench.

References

External links

1959 births
Living people
People from São João da Madeira
Sportspeople from Aveiro District
Portuguese footballers
Association football wingers
Primeira Liga players
Liga Portugal 2 players
Segunda Divisão players
A.D. Sanjoanense players
FC Porto players
G.D. Chaves players
S.C. Braga players
S.C. Espinho players
Portugal international footballers
UEFA Euro 1984 players